Tweet Tweet My Lovely is an album by the English punk rock band Snuff. It was released in 1998 on Fat Wreck Chords.

Critical reception
AllMusic wrote that "Snuff has ability, humor, throaty vocals, and nine different tempos to work in, as well as the occasional nutty brass and pretty '60s organ."

Track listing
All songs written by Snuff, unless otherwise stated
"No Reason" – 2:11    
"Ticket" – 2:02    
"Timebomb" – 0:46     
"Lyehf Taidu Leikh" – 2:58    
"Nick Motown" (Redmonds) – 2:25    
"Brickwall" – 1:46    
"Arsehole" – 2:37     
"Bob" – 1:12     
"All You Need" – 2:31     
"Etc." – 1:40     
"Thief" – 2:52     
"Verdidn't" – 2:23     
"Bit Cosy" (Batsford, Murphy, Redmonds, Wong) – 2:14     
"Take Me Home (Piss Off)" – 4:05

Credits
 Duncan Redmonds – vocals, drums
 Loz Wong – guitar
 Lee Batsford – bass
 Produced by Snuff
 Engineered by Harvey Birrell
 Mixed by Ryan Greene

References

External links
Fat Wreck Chords album page

1998 albums
Snuff (band) albums
Fat Wreck Chords albums